Martinus Becanus (6 January 1563 – 24 January 1624) was a Dutch-born Jesuit priest, known as a theologian and controversialist.

Life
He was born Maarten Schellekens in Hilvarenbeek in North Brabant; Schellekens is a patronymic and he adopted a Latinized form of the surname Van (Hilvaren)Beek. He entered the Society of Jesus on 22 March 1583, and taught Theology for twenty-two years at Würzburg, Mainz, and Vienna. 

He died in Vienna, where he was the confessor to the Emperor Ferdinand II.

Works
A first class controversialist and prolific writer Becanus is the author of some 37 books, most of them works of polemics. 
He developed the art of controversy and taught it in his book : Manuale controversiarum huius temporis published in Wurzburg (1623), that went into more than 50 editions (in the shortened version until the late 18th century).
In De fide haereticis servanda (1607) he defended the view that Protestants and Catholics should observe contracts concluded between one another.
Another book had much success: Analogia veteris et novi Testamenti.
He supported Cardinal Bellarmine in the major allegiance oath controversy with James I of England, publishing six books in the period 1610 to 1613, one against William Tooker and another being directed at Lancelot Andrewes. At the time he was based in Mainz; he was brought into the front line of the discussion of Bellarmine's Apologia by Attileo Amalteo, the nuncio at Cologne.

Among numerous other works was his Summa Theologiae Scholasticae.

References
 Scholasticon page
 (in german) Werner Raupp: Art. Becanus (Bécan, Verbee[c]k, Van der Bee[c]k; Schellekens, Scell-), Martinus (Martin). In: Frühe Neuzeit in Deutschland 1620–1720. Literaturwissenschaftliches Verfasserlexikon (VL 17), Vol. 1, Berlin/Boston: De Gruyter 2019, Cols. 481–502 (with detailed Bibliography).
 W. Decock (ed.), I. Buhre (transl.), T. Dienst/Ch. Strohm (introd.), Martinus Becanus. On the Duty to Keep Faith with Heretics, Sources in Early Modern Economics, Ethics and Law, Grand Rapids, 2019, .

Notes

Attribution

1563 births
1624 deaths
17th-century Jesuits
16th-century Dutch Roman Catholic theologians
People from Hilvarenbeek
16th-century Jesuits